Edmund Joseph Porray (December 5, 1888 – July 13, 1954) was a major league pitcher. A right-handed pitcher, he had a brief Major League career in which he pitched in 3 games for the  Buffalo Buffeds of the Federal League, compiling a 0–1 record with a 4.35 earned run average in 10 innings pitched.

During World War I, Porray served overseas as a pianist entertaining the troops.  After the war, he toured on the Keith and Orpheum vaudeville circuits. 

Today, Porray is best remembered for his unusual birthplace, as he is the only Major League Baseball player to have been born at sea. His birth certificate lists "At sea, on the Atlantic Ocean" as his birthplace.

Porray died at the age of 65 in Lackawaxen, Pennsylvania, and is interred at the Odd Fellows Cemetery in that town.

References

External links

1888 births
1954 deaths
People born at sea
Major League Baseball pitchers
Buffalo Buffeds players
Springfield Ponies players
Lansing Senators players
Albany Babies players
Pittsburgh Filipinos players
Atlantic City (minor league baseball) players
Norfolk Tars players